The German Institute for Japanese Studies (DIJ Tokyo) is a German research institute based in Tokyo, focused on the study of modern Japan in a global context. The director is Franz Waldenberger (since 2014).

See also
Germany–Japan relations

References 

Cultural studies organizations
Organizations based in Tokyo
Japanese studies
Germany–Japan relations
Max Weber Foundation